Skorno pri Šoštanju is a settlement in the Municipality of Šoštanj in northern Slovenia. The area is part of the traditional region of Styria. The municipality is now included in the Savinja Statistical Region.

Name
The name of the settlement was changed from Skorno to Skorno pri Šoštanju in 1952.

Church
The local church is dedicated to Saint Anthony the Hermit and belongs to the Parish of Šoštanj. It dates to the 16th century.

References

External links
Skorno pri Šoštanju at Geopedia

Populated places in the Municipality of Šoštanj